Luboměř pod Strážnou is a municipality and village in Přerov District in the Olomouc Region of the Czech Republic. It has about 100 inhabitants.

History
The first written mention of Luboměř pod Strážnou is from 1394.

After the World War II, the population was displaced and the municipality was incorporated into the newly established Libavá Military Training Area. The territory of the village was used to accommodate employees, which saved it from complete extinction. Luboměř pod Strážnou became again a separate municipality on 1 January 2016 by reduction of Libavá Military Training Area.

References

Villages in Přerov District